Willmore may refer to:

People
 Ben Willmore, American photographer and technology writer 
 Henrietta Willmore (1842–1938), Australian musician and suffragette 
 Ian Willmore (1958–2020), British activist 
 James Tibbits Willmore (1800–1863), British engraver
 Jeff Willmore (born 1954), Canadian artist
 Micheál Mac Liammóir (1899–1978), British–Irish actor, writer, painter etc. 
 Norman Willmore (1909–1965), politician in Alberta, Canada
 Patrick Willmore (1921–1994), British seismologist
 Thomas Willmore (1919–2005), English geometer
 William Erwin Willmore (either 1844 or 1845–1901), English-born American teacher and the founder of a colony

Other
 The Willmore, an apartment building in California
 Willmore Wilderness Park, Alberta, Canada

See also
 Willmore energy in differential geometry
 Willmore conjecture on toruses
 Wilmore (disambiguation)